Cozma is a commune in Mureș County, Transylvania, Romania. It is composed of five villages: Cozma, Fânațele Socolului (Szénaszokol), Socolu de Câmpie (Mezőszokol), Valea Sasului (Szászvölgye) and Valea Ungurului (Magyarvölgye).

References

Communes in Mureș County
Localities in Transylvania